The 1928 Syracuse Orangemen football team represented Syracuse University in the 1928 college football season. The Orangemen were led by second-year head coach Lew Andreas and played their home games at Archbold Stadium in Syracuse, New York.

Schedule

References

Syracuse
Syracuse Orange football seasons
Syracuse Orangemen football